This is a list of World Heritage Sites in Tunisia with properties of cultural and natural heritage in Tunisia as inscribed in UNESCO's World Heritage List or as on the country's tentative list. As of 2017, eight sites in Tunisia are included. In addition to its inscribed sites, Tunisia also lists thirteen properties on its tentative list.

World Heritage Sites 

Site; named after the World Heritage Committee's official designation
Location; at city, regional, or provincial level and geocoordinates
Criteria; as defined by the World Heritage Committee
Area; in hectares and acres. If available, the size of the buffer zone has been noted as well. The lack of value implies that no data has been published by UNESCO
Year; during which the site was inscribed to the World Heritage List
Description; brief information about the site, including reasons for qualifying as an endangered site, if applicable

Tentative list
In addition to sites inscribed on the World Heritage List, member states can maintain a list of tentative sites that they may consider for nomination. Nominations for the World Heritage List are only accepted if the site was previously listed on the tentative list. As of 2017, Tunisia lists thirteen properties on its tentative list:

See also
Tourism in Tunisia
List of World Heritage Sites in the Arab states

References

World Heritage Sites in Tunisia
Tunisia
World Heritage Sites